The Honda CR-X del Sol (marketed in other markets as the Honda Civic del Sol, Honda del Sol and the Honda CRX) is a two-seater targa top car manufactured by Honda from 1992 until 1998. Despite the body resemblance to a mid-engine car design, the del Sol is based on the front-engined Honda Civic platform and was the successor to the Honda CR-X.

The Spanish name del Sol translates to of the sun, and refers to the car's opening roof. The del Sol featured a removable aluminum hardtop that stowed onto a hinged frame in the trunk and a motorized drop-down rear window. Manual and automatic "TransTop" roofs were available in select markets.  It is the first open-air Honda sold in the United States.

Production and sales ended with the 1997 model in North America and 1998 elsewhere.

Japanese and European markets

The CR-X del Sol was first introduced to Japan and Europe in 1992 for the 1993 model year.  The base model (called the VXi in Japan) came equipped with 13-inch steel wheels, available only at Honda Verno Japanese dealerships. The Japanese VXi/VGi versions came with a Honda D15B-VTEC 4-cylinder engine, an entry level SOHC VTEC engine that produced . 

The "Si" (called the "ESi" in Europe) model came standard with a 1.6-liter SOHC VTEC 16-valve 4-cylinder engine. The Si also came with 14-inch alloy wheels, which were offered in an optional body-color-matched paint scheme on Samba Green models, power side mirrors, cruise control, rear disc brakes, wider tires, and additional front & rear anti-sway bars.

A premium model, VTi, was also available in Europe which came equipped with the same 1.6-liter DOHC VTEC 4-cylinder engine available in the North American del Sol VTEC.

The SiR models in Japan are powered by a  1.6-liter DOHC VTEC (B16A) 4-cylinder engine available with an optional limited-slip differential.

Depending on model and market, the options included a rear spoiler, custom floor mats, an automatic transmission, power steering, heated mirrors, front fog lights, traction control system (JDM only), limited-slip differential (JDM only), and air conditioning.

North American market
For the North American market, the car was marketed as a Civic del Sol upon its release for the 1993 model year.

During its initial year, trim levels were limited to the S and Si models powered by SOHC Honda D-series 4-cylinder engines.  In 1994, the Civic del Sol VTEC model was added which included the 1.6-liter 16-valve DOHC VTEC 4-cylinder engine producing , stiffer suspension as well as larger front disc brakes and larger 14-inch tires.  The S and Si models were available with either 5-speed manual transmission or 4-speed automatic while the del Sol VTEC model was only available with a 5-speed manual transmission.

In 1994, dual air bags would become standard.  Beginning in 1995, the car would be marketed as the Honda del Sol (Civic being removed from the name).  In 1996, the del Sol would receive a minor interior and exterior styling refresh and the S model would get a 1.6-liter SOHC 4-cylinder engine replacing the 1.5-liter engine that came in the 93-95 models.  1997 would be the final year of production for the del Sol in North America.

Colors
The 1993-1994 U.S. Domestic Market Del Sol came in five colors, namely Captiva Blue Pearl (color code B62P), Frost White (code NH538), Granada Black Pearl (code NH503P), Milano Red (code R81), and Samba Green Pearl (code GY15P). For 1995, Honda replaced Captiva Blue Pearl and Samba Green Pearl with Isle Green Pearl (code G71P) and Paradise Blue-Green Pearl (code BG33P), and made Frost White available on the Si. For 1996-1997, Honda removed the Paradise Blue-Green Pearl color, replaced Isle Green Pearl with Cypress Green Pearl (code G82P), and added Vogue Silver Metallic (NH583M).

TransTop

Most del Sols came equipped with a  aluminum roof that could be manually removed and stowed onto a hinged frame in the trunk where it only took up  of trunk space.  An option available in Japan and Europe was the TransTop, an electric mechanism which retracted the targa top into the trunk via a push of a button. The roof is operated by flicking two catches above the windows, then holding down a button. The trunk lid raises vertically and two arms extend into the targa top. After locking the lid to the arms, the arms pull the targa into the trunk lid, which lowers back down with the roof inside. The open process is reversed for the closure and return of the targa top.

Model updates 
Autumn 1992 ('93 model year):
CR-X del Sol launched in Japan with two trim levels - VXi and SiR (Japan Domestic Market)

Civic del Sol launched in USA with two trim levels - S and Si (U.S.)

CR-X del Sol launched in Europe with two trim levels- ESi and VTi (Europe Domestic Market)

U.S. Domestic Market changes for 1994:
Added VTEC trim level, with B16A3 engine (DOHC VTEC)   (U.S.),  9,000 rpm tachometer, and improved suspension (U.S.)
S trim level receives front sway bar
Dual SRS airbags standard (U.S.)

Changes for 1995:
Civic tag dropped from US del Sol name. Model now called del Sol (U.S.)
VXi was only available in Japan as a 1.5 SOHC VTEC. VGi, which was the Japanese version of the European ESi 1.6 SOHC VTEC, replaced the VXi. (Japan Domestic Market)
Redesigned targa top seals to help prevent leakage (U.S.)
Added anti-lock brakes (VTEC model),  base weight now (U.S.)
Heater vents in center console can now be open or closed
Added remote trunk release (U.S.)
Low fuel light (U.S.)
New alloy wheel design (U.S.) 
 S receives redesigned wheel covers (U.S.)
 Si and VTEC receive redesigned alloy wheels

Changes for 1996 (mid-model refresh):
Elimination of front auxiliary headlamps (U.S.)
Small airdam / rear deck aesthetic treatment (U.S.)
New front bumper and air dam (U.S.)
Length increase to (U.S.)
The base del Sol S receives the 106 hp 1.6-liter engine, a four-hp increase over previous years' 1.5-liter. (U.S.)
The del Sol Si receives the 127 hp 1.6-liter SOHC VTEC D16Y8 Civic engine, as well as the suspension, larger front and rear stabilizer bars, and steering of the  VTEC model. (U.S.)
The del Sol VTEC receives the 160 hp B16A2 engine (U.S.)
OBD-II Emission control system implemented.
New seat materials (U.S.)
New carpeting material (U.S.)

Change for 1997:
Production ends (United States, Canada)

End of Production in 1998:
Production ends (Japan, Europe)

Sales
Number of del Sols sold in the United States by calendar year:

Due to a production delay, some of the 1996 U.S. Domestic Market sales were leftover 1995 model year cars.

VIN Decoder
VIN Decoder for U.S. Domestic Market del Sol:
 Example     Description
  Vin #
 -------    --------------------------------
    J   ]─ Country of Manufacture: J= Japan
    H   ]─ Make: H= Honda Motor Company
    M   ]─ Passenger car
    E   ┐ 	   EG1 = D15B7 (93-95 S)
    G   ├─ Engine:  EG2 = B16A3 (94-95 VTEC), B16A2 (96-97 VTEC)
    1   ┘	   EH6 = D16Z6 (93-95 Si), D16Y7 (96-97 S), D16Y8 (96-97 Si) 
    1   ]─ Body/Transmission: 1= 2-Door manual 5-speed   2= 2-Door automatic
    4   ]─ Vehicle Series: 4= S, 6= Si, 7 or 9= VTEC
    3   ]─ Check Digit
    S   ]─ Model Year: P= 1993, R= 1994, S= 1995, T= 1996, V= 1997
    S   ]─ Assembly Plant: S= Suzuka
    0   ┐
    0   │
    1   ├── Serial Number, sequentially numbered via production output
    2   │
    3   |
    4   ┘

Notes

References

CR-X del Sol
CR-X del Sol
Front-wheel-drive vehicles
Sport compact cars
Cars introduced in 1992